The Stade de la Beaujoire – Louis Fonteneau, mostly known as Stade de la Beaujoire, is a stadium in Nantes, France. It is the home of French football club FC Nantes.

The stadium opened for the first time on 8 May 1984, for a friendly game between FC Nantes and Romania in front of 30,000 fans. It was named after Louis Fonteneau, who was president of FC Nantes between 1969–1986. It was renovated in 1998, for the 1998 FIFA World Cup. While its original capacity was 52,923, in 1998 it was converted to an all-seater stadium and its current capacity is 38,128. Highest attendance was 51,359 for France-Belgium match in 1984. Previously, the team played at Stade Marcel Saupin.

The stadium also hosts international rugby matches, including France against New Zealand (16-3) on November 15, 1986. In September 2007, it hosted three pool matches of the 2007 Rugby World Cup: Wales vs Canada on September 9, England vs Samoa on September 22 and Wales vs Fiji on September 29. In domestic rugby, La Beaujoire hosted both Top 14 semifinal matches in 2013, and Paris-area Top 14 side Racing Métro 92 will play their final "home" match of the 2013–14 season against Clermont at La Beaujoire on April 19, 2014.

La Beaujoire hosted matches during the UEFA Euro 1984, including a 5–0 victory for France over Belgium with three goals from Michel Platini. Six matches were also played there during the 1998 FIFA World Cup, including the quarter-final between Brazil and Denmark. The stadium was not selected for the UEFA Euro 2016.

The France national football team have played here on five occasions, most recently in 2019 where they played a friendly match against Bolivia.

Future
A new stadium named YelloPark was planned to replace the Stade de la Beaujoire, which was to be demolished for the 2024 Summer Olympics in Paris and the 2023 Rugby World Cup. On 26 February 2019, the project was cancelled.

1984 European Championship (Euro 1984) 
The stadium was selected as one of the venues of 1984 UEFA European Championship and held the following matches

1998 FIFA World Cup
The stadium was one of the venues of the 1998 FIFA World Cup, and held the following matches:

2023 Rugby World Cup
The stadium will be one of the venues of the 2023 Rugby World Cup, and will host the following matches:

References

1998 FIFA World Cup stadiums
Stade de la Beaujoire
Football venues in France
Stade de la Beaujoire
Rugby World Cup stadiums
UEFA Euro 1984 stadiums
Rugby union stadiums in France
Sports venues completed in 1984
Stade de la Beaujoire
Olympic football venues
Venues of the 2024 Summer Olympics